This is a list of bishops of Troyes.

 1716–1742 : Jacques-Bénigne Bossuet II
 1742–1758 : M. Poncet de la Rivière
 1758–1761 : Jean-Baptiste-Marie Champion de Cicé
 1761–1790 : Louis-Claude-Mathias-Joseph Conte de Barral (later archbishop of Tours)

In 1790 the ancien régime and the diocese were abolished by the French revolutionaries.  The diocese was restored in 1791 and was given constitutional bishops by the regime.

 1791–1793 : Augustin Sibille (constitutional bishop)
 1802–1802 : Marc-Antoine de Noé
 1802–1808 : Louis-Apolinaire de la Tour du Pin-Montauban
 1809–1825 : Etienne-Marie de Boulogne (Étienne-Antoine Boulogne)
 1825–1843 : Jacques-Louis-David de Seguin des Hons
 1843–1848 : Jean-Marie-Mathias Debelay (later archbishop of Avignon)
 1848–1860 : Pierre-Louis Cœur
 1860–1875 : Emmanuel-Jules Ravinet
 1875–1898 : Pierre-Louis-Marie Cortet
 1898–1907 : Gustave-Adolphe de Pélacot (later archbishop of Chambéry)
 1907–1927 : Laurent-Marie-Etienne Monnier
 1927–1932 : Maurice Feltin (later bishop of Sens, archbishop of Bordeaux, archbishop of Paris, also cardinal)
 1933–1938 : Joseph-Jean Heintz (later bishop of Metz)
 1938–1943 : Joseph-Charles Lefèbvre (later archbishop of Bourges, also cardinal)
 1943–1967 : Julien Le Couëdic
 1967–1992 : André Pierre Louis Marie Fauchet
 1992–1998 : Gérard-Antoine Daucourt (later bishop of Orléans)
 1999 onwards : Marc-Camille-Michel Stenger

See also
 Timeline of Troyes

Notes

 
France religion-related lists
Troyes
Troyes
History of Grand Est